Michael Joseph Cantwell (June 15, 1894 – January 5, 1953) was a Major League Baseball pitcher. In 11 career games, he had a 1–6 record with a 4.61 ERA. He batted and threw left-handed.

Cantwell served in the United States Marines during World War I.

Cantwell was born in Washington, D.C. and died in Oteen, North Carolina.

References

External links

1894 births
1953 deaths
New York Yankees players
Philadelphia Phillies players
Major League Baseball pitchers
Baseball players from Washington, D.C.
Buffalo Bisons (minor league) players